The 2021 Boston City Council election was held on November 2, 2021. All thirteen councillors from the nine districts and four councillors at-large were up for election. Elections in Boston are officially nonpartisan.

Councillors Andrea Campbell, Annissa Essaibi George, Kim Janey, and Michelle Wu ran in the mayoral election, while Matt O'Malley did not seek re-election. Councillors Ricardo Arroyo, Frank Baker, Kenzie Bok, Liz Breadon, Lydia Edwards, Michael F. Flaherty, and Julia Mejia ran for re-election.

Background

Marty Walsh was elected to the mayoralty of Boston, Massachusetts, in the 2013 and 2017 elections. On January 7, 2021, President-elect Joe Biden announced that he would select Walsh to serve as the United States Secretary of Labor. Walsh resigned as mayor on March 22, after being confirmed as Secretary of Labor, and was replaced as acting-mayor by Kim Janey, who also served as president of the Boston City Council.

The city council voted to move the primary election date from September 21, to September 14, in order to allow for another week mail-in voting ballots to be distributed for the general election and was approved by Mayor Janey.

Incumbent status

Campaign

At-large

Michelle Wu, who had served on the city council since 2014, announced that she would run in the mayoral election on September 15, 2020. Annissa Essaibi George, who had served on the city council since 2016, announced that she would run in the mayoral election on January 27, 2021. Incumbent councillors Julia Mejia, who had won election to the city council by one vote in the 2019 election, and Michael F. Flaherty are running for reelection.

Althea Garrison, the first openly transgender person to serve in a state legislature and former member of the city council, Ruthzee Louijeune, a lawyer who worked as senior counsel for Senator Elizabeth Warren's presidential and senatorial campaigns, Alex Gray, a policy analyst, and Nick Vance, a political action co-chair of the NAACP in Boston, are running in the election.

Note: The primary result is uncertified

1st district

Lydia Edwards, who was first elected to the city council in 2017, announced that she would run for reelection and launched her campaign on February 26, 2021, at a virtual event.

2nd district

Councillor Ed Flynn filed to run for reelection.

3rd district

Frank Baker, who was first elected in 2011, announced that he would run for reelection after initially wanting to leave politics until the COVID-19 pandemic changed his plans. Stephen McBride is running in the election.

4th district

Andrea Campbell, who had served on the city council since 2016, announced on September 24, 2020, that she would run for mayor. Evandro Carvalho, who served in the Massachusetts House of Representatives, announced that he would run in the election on October 19. Leonard M. Lee Sr., a community organizer and member of the Boston Parks Commission, announced on February 3, 2021, that he would run in the election stating that he was inspired to run after a nineteen-year-old was killed by the police outside his home. William Dickerson III, a former city council aide, Nikkia Jean-Charles, who was inspired by Ayanna Pressley's campaign for a seat in the United States House of Representatives, Trina Ruffin, and Troy Smith are running in the election. Joel Richards, a Boston Public School Teacher and Boston Teachers Union activist, is also running in the election.

Note: The primary result is uncertified

5th district

Councillor Ricardo Arroyo is running for reelection and John White is also running in the election.

6th district

Kendra Hicks, an activist, announced that she would run against councilor Matt O'Malley in the 2021 election. O'Malley, who was first elected to the city council in 2010, announced that he would not seek reelection on December 2, 2020, so that he could focus on his family.

Note: The primary result is uncertified

7th district
Kim Janey, who was serving as acting-mayor and who had served on the city council since 2018, announced on April 6, 2021, that she would run in the mayoral election. Tania Fernandes Anderson, Angelina Camacho, Joao DePina, Marisa Luse, Santiago Rivera, and Lorraine Payne Wheeler are running in the election.

Note: The primary result is uncertified

8th district

Kenzie Bok, who was first elected in 2019, filed to run for re-election.

9th district

Liz Breadon, who was first elected to the city council in 2019, is running for reelection against  Michael J. Bianchi and entrepreneur Eric Porter.

Note: The primary result is uncertified

Campaign finance

Endorsements

At-large district

1st district

2nd district

4th district

5th district

6th district

7th district

8th district

9th district

Polling

At-large

General election

Notes

References

Further reading

External links
 Election office at boston.gov

City Council election
Boston City Council elections
Boston City Council election
Boston City Council